Universidad de Santiago is an underground metro station on the Line 1 of the Santiago Metro, in Santiago, Chile. Is named for the nearby University of Santiago. The station is adjacent to the Evangelical Cathedral of Santiago and to the main bus stations in the city. It was opened on 15 September 1975 as part of the inaugural section of the line between San Pablo and La Moneda.

The station has a central mezzanine that overlooks the outer portions of the platform level. There is artwork on the walls of the four platforms stairways that honors the aforementioned university, which was unveiled on August 30, 2005.

References

Santiago Metro stations
Railway stations opened in 1975
1975 establishments in Chile